Nymphs were a group of creatures in Proto-Indo-European mythology. Although their name cannot be reconstructed based on available linguistic evidence, they are portrayed in many different Indo-European traditions with comparable motifs. According to scholar Martin L. West, it is very likely that Proto-Indo-European beliefs featured some sorts of beautiful and sometimes dangerous water goddesses who seduced mortal men, akin to the Greek naiads, the nymphs of fresh waters.

Depiction 
The Vedic Apsarás are said to frequent forest lakes, rivers, trees, and mountains. They are of outstanding beauty, and Indra sends them to lure men. In Ossetic mythology, the waters are ruled by Donbettyr ("Water-Peter"), who has daughters of extraordinary beauty and with golden hair. In Armenian folklore, the Parik take the form of beautiful women who dance amid nature. The Slavonic water nymphs víly are also depicted as alluring maidens with long golden or green hair who like young men and can do harm if they feel offended. The Albanian mountain nymphs, Perit and Zana, are portrayed as beautiful but also dangerous creatures. Similar to the Baltic nymph-like Laumes, they have the habit of abducting children. The beautiful and long-haired Laumes also have sexual relations and short-lived marriages with men. The Breton Korrigans are irresistible creatures with golden hair wooing mortal men and causing them to perish for love. The Norse Huldra, Iranian Ahuraīnīs and Lycian Eliyãna can likewise be regarded as reflexes of the water nymphs.

References

Bibliography 

Proto-Indo-European mythology